Carvone reductase is an enzyme with systematic name (+)-dihydrocarvone:acceptor 1,6-oxidoreductase. This enzyme catalyses the following chemical reaction

 (1) (+)-dihydrocarvone + acceptor  (-)-carvone + reduced acceptor
 (2) (-)-isodihydrocarvone + acceptor  (+)-carvone + reduced acceptor

This enzyme participates in the carveol and dihydrocarveol degradation pathway of the Gram-positive bacterium Rhodococcus erythropolis DCL14.

References

External links 
 

EC 1.3.99